Ritch Hall is a historic building on the campus of Western New Mexico University in Silver City, New Mexico. It was built as a women's dormitory. Its construction cost $30,000, and it was completed in 1906, with remodels in 1925 and 1948. The building was named in honor of W.G. Ritch, who served as the president of the board of regents of WNMU from 1902 to 1904. It was designed in the Mission Revival style by architect Charles Frederick Whittlesey in 1906, and an extension was designed by architect John Gaw Meem in 1950. It has been listed on the National Register of Historic Places since September 22, 1988.

References

National Register of Historic Places in Grant County, New Mexico
Mission Revival architecture in New Mexico
School buildings completed in 1906
School buildings on the National Register of Historic Places in New Mexico
University and college dormitories in the United States
Western New Mexico University
1906 establishments in New Mexico Territory